Ndau (also called chiNdau, Chindau, Ndzawu, Njao, Sofala, Southeast Shona, Chidanda) is a Bantu language spoken by 1,400,000 people in central Mozambique and southeastern Zimbabwe.  The major varieties in Mozambique are called Shanga and Danda; that in Zimbabwe is simply called Ndau or Ndaundau.

Ndau is part of a continuum with other neighboring varieties of the Shona group (e.g. Manyika, Karanga) and has often been included as a Shona dialect. The 2013 Constitution of Zimbabwe accorded Ndau status as an official language. 

At least some speakers have a bilabial nasal click where neighboring dialects have /mw/, as in mwana 'child'.

Sample text

The mutual intelligibility of Ndau with other Shona varieties is fairly high, but some speakers of other Shona varieties may find it difficult to understand. Differences and similarities can be measured by examining a Ndau version of Lord's Prayer:

Baba edu ari mudenga, ngariremeredzwe zina renyu. UMambo hwenyu ngahuuye. Kuda kwenyu ngakuitwa munyika kudai ngomudenga. Tipei nege kurya kwedu kwatinotama nyamashi. Tirekererei ndaa dzedu kudai tisu takarekerera avo vane ndaa kwetiri. Usatipinza mukuedzwa, asi tinunure kuno uwo wakashata.

The equivalent paragraph in Standard Shona (mainly based on Zezuru) is:

Baba vedu vari kudenga, zita renyu ngarikudzwe. UMambo hwenyu ngahwuuye. Kuda kwenyu ngakuitwe pasi sokudenga. Tipei nhasi kudya kwedu kwakwezuva. Tiregererei zvatinokutadzirai sekuregerera kwatinoita vakatitadzira. Musatipinze mukuedzwa, asi mutinunure mune zvakaipa.

Alphabet
While the mainstream Shona language excludes L, Q and X from its alphabet, Ndau orthography uses them as shown by the examples below:

 Mainstream Shona "Akatizira and the Ndau version Akafohla: 'L' is used in the digraph hl for the sound .
 Mainstream Shona "kuridza tsamwa and the Ndau version kuxapa: 'X' is used for the click consonant .
 Mainstream Shona "Kurara and the Ndau version Kuqambaya: 'Q' is used for the click consonant .

These sounds have been acquired from neighboring Nguni languages.

References

Shona languages
Click languages